Lissi Anna-Belle Strömberg (born 1965) is a Swedish politician and member of the Riksdag, the national legislature. A member of the Social Democratic Party, she has represented Västernorrland County since November 2021. She had previously been a substitute member of the Riksdag for Stefan Löfven between September 2021 and November 2021.

Strömberg had been a member of the municipal council in Örnsköldsvik Municipality before entering the Riksdag.

References

1965 births
Living people
Members of the Riksdag 2018–2022
Members of the Riksdag 2022–2026
Members of the Riksdag from the Social Democrats
People from Örnsköldsvik Municipality
Women members of the Riksdag
21st-century Swedish women politicians